The Graf–Sabatini rivalry was a tennis rivalry between Steffi Graf and Gabriela Sabatini, who played each other on 40 occasions between 1985 and 1995. Graf was the world No. 1, while Sabatini reached a career high of No. 3. Both are Major champions, Graf winning 22 titles whilst Sabatini won her only major title at the 1990 US Open over Graf. They also teamed up in doubles to reach three French Open finals and win the 1988 Wimbledon crown.

In Grand Slams, they met 12 times, three of them in finals. Graf leads 11–1. In 1988, Graf beat Sabatini in the semifinals of the French Open, the US Open final, and the Olympic final to complete the calendar-year Golden Slam. Their most famous match came in the 1991 Wimbledon final. Sabatini was two points away from capturing her Wimbledon singles crown, only for Graf to fight back and take the match 8–6 in the deciding set.

Graf and Sabatini first met in 1985 and by the end of 1987 had met a total of eleven times, Graf winning all of them. Sabatini went on to defeat Graf 11 times in the next 21 matches they played between 1988 and 1992, with the Argentine going on a five-match winning streak and Graf on a four-match winning streak. Sabatini then lost the final eight matches they played between 1992 and 1995. According to Sabatini, they had a good relationship off the court, but were never close friends.

On September 25, 2004, Graf defeated Sabatini 6-1, 7-5 in an exhibition match in Berlin, Germany. They met the following year at an exhibition match in Mannheim, Germany on October 15, 2005, where Graf again beat Sabatini in straight sets 6-4, 6-2.

Graf introduced Sabatini during the 2006 International Tennis Hall of Fame Induction on July 15, 2006.

List of all matches

Graf–Sabatini (29–11)

Breakdown of the rivalry 
Hard courts: Graf, 11–5
Clay courts: Graf, 10–4
Grass courts: Graf, 3–0
Carpet courts: Graf, 5–2
Grand Slam matches: Graf, 11–1
Grand Slam finals: Graf, 2–1
Year-End Championships matches: Graf, 3–1
Year-End Championships finals: Graf, 1–0
Fed Cup matches: Graf, 1–0
All finals: Graf, 10–6
All matches: Graf, 29–11

See also
List of tennis rivalries

References

Tennis rivalries
Steffi Graf